Kizimbani (or Kisimbani) is a settlement of the Zanzibar Urban/West Region in Unguja, the main island of Zanzibar, Tanzania. It is located in the interior of the island, north-east of Zanzibar City. The remnants of old Persian public baths are found in this town.

Kizimbani is close to an eponymous forest, as well as a spice farm where several kinds of spices are cultivated, mostly as a visitor attraction; most so-called "Spice Tours" proposed by local travel operators are based in Kizimbani. Cultivation on display for the visitors include cinnamon, pepper, ginger, lemon grass, iodine, cocoa, nutmeg, clove, and vanilla.

References

Populated places in Zanzibar
Geography of Mjini Magharibi Region